Vyacheslav Alekseyevich Isupov (born 16 January 1993) is a Russian football goalkeeper.

Club career
He made his debut in the Russian Second Division for FC Lokomotiv-2 Moscow on 15 July 2013 in a game against FC Khimki.

He made his Russian Football National League debut for FC Khimki on 31 July 2016 in a game against FC Sibir Novosibirsk.

References

External links
 Career summary by sportbox.ru  
 
 
 

1993 births
Sportspeople from Izhevsk
Living people
Russian footballers
Russia youth international footballers
Russia under-21 international footballers
Association football goalkeepers
FC Vityaz Podolsk players
FC Khimki players
PFC CSKA Moscow players
FC Neftekhimik Nizhnekamsk players
FC Lokomotiv Moscow players